Four Aces may refer to:

 Four Aces or Tribe of the Four Aces, a soldier of The 82nd Airborne Division who has deployed with the Division and wears an 82nd patch on both arms of their uniform.
 Four Aces (passenger liners), a series of 1929–1931 American cruise ships, later converted to World War II military transport
 Four Aces (Wild Cards), a team of superheroes in the Wild Cards shared universe
 The Four Aces, an American male pop music quartet from 1950
 The Four Aces Club, a pioneering music venue in Dalston, London
 Four Aces (casino), a casino in South Dakota
 Four Aces (bridge), a 1930s American contract bridge team led by David Burnstine (later to become David Bruce)
 The Four Aces, a nickname for Peruvian Navy members Miguel Grau, Lizardo Montero, Aurelio García and Manuel Ferreyros.
 A variety of card trick involving the four aces.

See also
 Aces Four, an Irish thoroughbred racehorse born 1999